Maigo, officially the Municipality of Maigo (Maranao: Inged a Maigo), is a 4th class municipality in the province of Lanao del Norte, Philippines. According to the 2020 census, it has a population of 23,337 people.

History

The town was originally part of Kolambugan before it was declared a municipality of its own; it was created a few years after the neighboring town of Bacolod was separated from Kolambugan. Executive Order No. 331 of 1959 created Maigo from the following:
 From Kolambugan: Maigo, Balagatasa, Sigapud, and Mentring and their respective sitios.
 From Bacolod: Liagan Proper, Barogohan, Camps I, II, and III and their respective sitios.
A simple town where Muslims and Christians are living in harmony. But in recent years it had been the target of Moro Islamic Liberation Front which would later result to the fear of the people. Many locals have migrated to other places in Lanao del Norte and to Manila to avoid the fighting.

Settlement
The majority of people living in what is now Miago were originally the Maranaos. According to folk story, during Spain occupation, some of the leaders from the interior areas of Lanao del Norte they would usually cross the beach of the municipality of Kolambogan to the beach of Ozamis City by boat to catch people living in the other side and take them as workers (personal helper). There was also a story that Mutia Family in Zamboanga del Norte and Misamis Occidental originally came from the interior of Lanao del Norte and even now still existing the story because of the great-great-great grandfather of their great-great grandfather of Mutia families in Zamboanga del Norte and Misamis Occidental lifted a small one piece of book hanging in the center of the house and said to the children the forbidden and do not even touch of even open the book, and according to the claimed soon for many years when somebody open they saw writing but not familiar (Spanish language, English language), and some say that near to Arabic letters.

In long living and social process and sometimes in 1935 – 1944, under the National Land Settlement Administration (NLSA) of the Commonwealth Government, there was a Philippine House of Representative proposal to further populate the island of Mindanao and use some land to help the Philippine Government, and one of the opposition that time was Congressman Datu Salipada Khalid Pendatun. The proposal was approved and signed by President Manuel L. Quezon. The settlers were composed of different people from the Visayas and Luzon that had knowledge and experience regarding agriculture, technical, farming, lumber, carpentry, etc. The first batch landed in the following areas:

In Lanao del Norte, the transport of settlers was peacefully successful due to the smooth negotiations with the Maranao tribal leaders and land lords. As a sign of Welcome sign, the land lords donated a piece of land (a piece of land before was more than 5 hectares) to start the settlers' life. In the long run, the families of settlers were employed by land owners and as a gift, since they were very good workers, the land lord gave them a small piece of land as a gift. Some say that, settlers trade they made the business to the land lord just few item exchange of lands. Some family of land lords marry the daughter of their workers which result and until the majority living in Lanao del Norte and Misamis Occidental has blood in Maranao Tribe (Muslim Blood).

On the hand, the settlement has a going problem and conflict between Non-Muslim and Muslim when Martial Law was implemented.

Geography

Barangays
Maigo is politically subdivided into 13 barangays.
 Balagatasa
 Camp
 Claro M. Recto
 Inoma
 Labuay
 Liangan West
 Mahayahay
 Maliwanag
 Mentring
 Poblacion
 Santa Cruz
 Sigapod
 Kulasihan (Villanueva)

Climate

Demographics

Economy

Government
Mayors after People Power Revolution 1986:

References

External links
 Maigo Profile at the DTI Cities and Municipalities Competitive Index
 [ Philippine Standard Geographic Code]
Philippine Census Information
Local Governance Performance Management System

Municipalities of Lanao del Norte
Establishments by Philippine executive order